Reighardiidae is a family of crustaceans belonging to the subclass Pentastomida. It is the only family in the monotypic order Reighardiida.

Genera
There are two genera recognised in the family Reighardiidae:
 Hispania Martínez, Criado-Fornelio, Lanzarot, Fernández-García, Rodríguez-Caabeiro & Merino, 2004
 Reighardia Ward, 1899

References

Crustaceans